Shalloch on Minnoch is a hill in the Range of the Awful Hand, a sub-range of the Galloway Hills range, part of the Southern Uplands of Scotland. It is frequently climbed from Stinchar bridge to the north, or as part of a full traverse of the range.

Subsidiary SMC Summits

External links
 Information on Shalloch-on-Minnoch routes with a map and large images

References

Marilyns of Scotland
Donald mountains
Corbetts
Mountains and hills of the Southern Uplands
Ayrshire
Mountains and hills of Dumfries and Galloway